The Flyer from Goerz (German: Der Flieger von Goerz) is a 1918 German silent war film directed by Georg Jacoby and starring Ellen Richter, Harry Liedtke and Johannes Müller.

Cast
 Ellen Richter as Giunetta 
 Harry Liedtke as Fliegeroberleutnant 
 Johannes Müller as Mario

References

Bibliography
 Hans-Michael Bock & Michael Töteberg. Das Ufa-Buch. Zweitausendeins, 1992.

External links

1918 films
Films of the German Empire
German silent feature films
Films directed by Georg Jacoby
German war films
1918 war films
UFA GmbH films
German black-and-white films
1910s German films